The Sculptured Rocks Natural Area is a  geology-oriented nature preserve in Groton, New Hampshire. The natural area's main feature is its namesake, the Sculptured Rocks, which are a series of narrow, sharply carved rock formations that are a popular local swimming hole. They are located on the Cockermouth River, which is the longest tributary of Newfound Lake.  The Sculptured Rocks Road, which runs along this same river, shares its namesake with the park.

References

External links
Sculptured Rocks Natural Area New Hampshire Department of Natural and Cultural Resources

State parks of New Hampshire
State parks of the Appalachians
Parks in Grafton County, New Hampshire
Landforms of Grafton County, New Hampshire